Han Xuegeng (Chinese: 韩学庚; born 10 July 1989) is a Chinese football player who currently plays for Dalian Boyoung in the China League Two.

Club career
In 2007, Han Xuegeng started his professional footballer career with Liaoning Whowin in the Chinese Super League. He would eventually make his league debut for Liaoning on 28 September 2012 in a game against Tianjin Teda. In February 2013，Han moved to China League Two side Lijiang Jiayunhao on a one-year loan deal.

In February 2014, Han transferred to Chinese Super League side Dalian Aerbin. In March 2018, Han transferred to China League Two club Dalian Boyoung.

Career statistics 
Statistics accurate as of match played 11 October 2019.

Honours

Club
Liaoning Whowin
China League One: 2009

References

1989 births
Living people
Chinese footballers
Footballers from Dalian
Yunnan Flying Tigers F.C. players
Liaoning F.C. players
Dalian Professional F.C. players
Chinese Super League players
China League One players
Association football defenders